Beaufille is a Canadian fashion label specializing in fashion, jewelry and accessories for women. Beaufille (pronounced bo-fee) is a nonsensical French word meaning “handsome girl,” or “one who presents an effortless chic demeanor.” The brand symbolizes the marriage of masculine and feminine and an allusion to their French names and heritage.

History
The company was originally founded as Chloé comme Parris in 2009 by sisters Chloé Gordon and Parris Gordon. In April 2013, the company name was changed to Beaufille. Both sisters studied at the Nova Scotia College of Art and Design. Chloé graduated in 2010 with a Bachelor of Fine Arts degree majoring in Textiles and now designs the ready-to-wear clothing. Parris graduated with a Bachelor of Fine Arts degree majoring in jewelry and now creates the accessories and jewelry for the brand.

Reception
Beaufille has been featured in Forbes, Vogue, Style.com, Nylon, FASHION, Women's Wear Daily and Glamour.

In 2017, Forbes mentioned, '"Beaufille's designs have clean lines and bold shapes."

In 2020, Vogue said, "In the Beaufille lexicon, sustainability equates to timeless, interesting pieces you can wear over and over..."

Notable clients
Beaufille has dressed celebrities such as Solange, Lady Gaga, Michelle Obama, Julia Garner, Elle Macpherson, Selena Gomez, Chloë Grace Moretz and the Haim (band) sisters.

Awards and honours 
In January 2015, Beaufille received the Emerging Accessories Award at the Canadian Arts and Fashion Awards.

In 2017, Beaufille received the Womenswear designer of the Year award at Canadian Arts and Fashion Awards.

Also in 2017 Beaufille made the Forbes 30 Under 30 List, saying, "Chloé and Parris Gordon, co-founders of Canadian fashion label Beaufille, are exemplars of the “effortless chic” aesthetic that's perpetually in vogue but so difficult to master."

Point of sale 
Beaufille is available at retailers worldwide, including Moda Operandi, Dover Street Market, Hudsons Bay Company, Nordstrom, Printemps, and Shopbop.

References

Sources

 
 
 
Plaid Magazine

External links 
 

Clothing companies of Canada